Influenza A virus (IAV) is a pathogen that causes the flu in birds and some mammals, including humans. It is an RNA virus whose subtypes have been isolated from wild birds. Occasionally, it is transmitted from wild to domestic birds, and this may cause severe disease, outbreaks, or human influenza pandemics.

Each virus subtype has mutated into a variety of strains with differing pathogenic profiles; some may cause disease only in one species but others to multiple ones.

A filtered and purified influenza A vaccine for humans has been developed and many countries have stockpiled it to allow a quick administration to the population in the event of an avian influenza pandemic. In 2011, researchers reported the discovery of an antibody effective against all types of the influenza A virus.

Variants and subtypes 

Influenza A virus is the only species of the genus Alphainfluenzavirus of the virus family Orthomyxoviridae. It is an RNA virus categorized into subtypes based on the type of two proteins on the surface of the viral envelope:

H = hemagglutinin, a protein that causes red blood cells to agglutinate.
N = neuraminidase, an enzyme that cleaves the glycosidic bonds of the monosaccharide sialic acid (previously called neuraminic acid).

The hemagglutinin is central to the virus's recognizing and binding to target cells, and also to its then infecting the cell with its RNA. The neuraminidase, on the other hand, is critical for the subsequent release of the daughter virus particles created within the infected cell so they can spread to other cells.

Different influenza viruses encode for different hemagglutinin and neuraminidase proteins. For example, the H5N1 virus designates an influenza A subtype that has a type 5 hemagglutinin (H) protein and a type 1 neuraminidase (N) protein. There are 18 known types of hemagglutinin and 11 known types of neuraminidase, so, in theory, 198 different combinations of these proteins are possible.

Some variants are identified and named according to the isolate they resemble, thus are presumed to share lineage (example Fujian flu virus-like); according to their typical host (example human flu virus); according to their subtype (example H3N2); and according to their deadliness (example LP, low pathogenic). So a flu from a virus similar to the isolate A/Fujian/411/2002(H3N2) is called Fujian flu, human flu, and H3N2 flu.

Variants are sometimes named according to the species (host) in which the strain is endemic or to which it is adapted. The main variants named using this convention are:
 Bird flu
 Human flu
 Swine influenza
 Equine influenza
 Canine influenza
 Bat influenza

Variants have also sometimes been named according to their deadliness in poultry, especially chickens:
 Low pathogenic avian influenza (LPAI)
 Highly pathogenic avian influenza (HPAI), also called deadly flu or death flu

Most known strains are extinct strains. For example, the annual flu subtype H3N2 no longer contains the strain that caused the Hong Kong flu.

Annual flu 

The annual flu (also called "seasonal flu" or "human flu") in the US "results in approximately 36,000 deaths and more than 200,000 hospitalizations each year. In addition to this human toll, influenza is annually responsible for a total cost of over $10 billion in the U.S." Globally the toll of influenza virus is estimated at 290,000–645,000 deaths annually, exceeding previous estimates.

The annually updated, trivalent influenza vaccine consists of hemagglutinin (HA) surface glycoprotein components from influenza H3N2, H1N1, and B influenza viruses.

Measured resistance to the standard antiviral drugs amantadine and rimantadine in H3N2 has increased from 1% in 1994 to 12% in 2003 to 91% in 2005.

"Contemporary human H3N2 influenza viruses are now endemic in pigs in southern China and can reassort with avian H5N1 viruses in this intermediate host."

FI6 antibody
FI6, an antibody that targets the hemagglutinin protein, was discovered in 2011. FI6 is the only known antibody effective against all 16 subtypes of the influenza A virus.

Structure and genetics
Influenza A viruses are negative-sense, single-stranded, segmented RNA virus. The several subtypes are labeled according to an H number (for the type of hemagglutinin) and an N number (for the type of neuraminidase). There are 18 different known H antigens (H1 to H18) and 11 different known N antigens (N1 to N11). H17N10 was isolated from fruit bats in 2012. H18N11 was discovered in a Peruvian bat in 2013.Influenza type A viruses are very similar in structure to influenza viruses types B, C, and D. The virus particle (also called the virion) is 80–120 nanometers in diameter such that the smallest virions adopt an elliptical shape. The length of each particle varies considerably, owing to the fact that influenza is pleomorphic, and can be in excess of many tens of micrometers, producing filamentous virions. Confusion about the nature of influenza virus pleomorphy stems from the observation that lab adapted strains typically lose the ability to form filaments and that these lab adapted strains were the first to be visualized by electron microscopy. Despite these varied shapes, the virions of all influenza type A viruses are similar in composition. They are all made up of a viral envelope containing two main types of proteins, wrapped around a central core.

The two large proteins found on the outside of viral particles are hemagglutinin (HA) and neuraminidase (NA). HA is a protein that mediates binding of the virion to target cells and entry of the viral genome into the target cell. NA is involved in release from the abundant non-productive attachment sites present in mucus as well as the release of progeny virions from infected cells. These proteins are usually the targets for antiviral drugs. Furthermore, they are also the antigen proteins to which a host's antibodies can bind and trigger an immune response. Influenza type A viruses are categorized into subtypes based on the type of these two proteins on the surface of the viral envelope. There are 16 subtypes of HA and 9 subtypes of NA known, but only H 1, 2 and 3, and N 1 and 2 are commonly found in humans.

The central core of a virion contains the viral genome and other viral proteins that package and protect the genetic material. Unlike the genomes of most organisms (including humans, animals, plants, and bacteria) which are made up of double-stranded DNA, many viral genomes are made up of a different, single-stranded nucleic acid called RNA. Unusually for a virus, though, the influenza type A virus genome is not a single piece of RNA; instead, it consists of segmented pieces of negative-sense RNA, each piece containing either one or two genes which code for a gene product (protein). The term negative-sense RNA just implies that the RNA genome cannot be translated into protein directly; it must first be transcribed to positive-sense RNA before it can be translated into protein products. The segmented nature of the genome allows for the exchange of entire genes between different viral strains.

The entire Influenza A virus genome is 13,588 bases long and is contained on eight RNA segments that code for at least 10 but up to 14 proteins, depending on the strain. The relevance or presence of alternate gene products can vary:
 Segment 1 encodes RNA polymerase subunit (PB2).
 Segment 2 encodes RNA polymerase subunit (PB1) and the PB1-F2 protein, which induces cell death, by using different reading frames from the same RNA segment.
 Segment 3 encodes RNA polymerase subunit (PA) and the PA-X protein, which has a role in host transcription shutoff.
 Segment 4 encodes for HA (hemagglutinin). About 500 molecules of hemagglutinin are needed to make one virion. HA determines the extent and severity of a viral infection in a host organism.
 Segment 5 encodes NP, which is a nucleoprotein.
 Segment 6 encodes NA (neuraminidase). About 100 molecules of neuraminidase are needed to make one virion.
 Segment 7 encodes two matrix proteins (M1 and M2) by using different reading frames from the same RNA segment. About 3,000 matrix protein molecules are needed to make one virion.
 Segment 8 encodes two distinct non-structural proteins (NS1 and NEP) by using different reading frames from the same RNA segment.

The RNA segments of the viral genome have complementary base sequences at the terminal ends, allowing them to bond to each other with hydrogen bonds. Transcription of the viral (-) sense genome (vRNA) can only proceed after the PB2 protein binds to host capped RNAs, allowing for the PA subunit to cleave several nucleotides after the cap. This host-derived cap and accompanied nucleotides serve as the primer for viral transcription initiation. Transcription proceeds along the vRNA until a stretch of several uracil bases is reached, initiating a 'stuttering' whereby the nascent viral mRNA is poly-adenylated, producing a mature transcript for nuclear export and translation by host machinery.

The RNA synthesis takes place in the cell nucleus, while the synthesis of proteins takes place in the cytoplasm. Once the viral proteins are assembled into virions, the assembled virions leave the nucleus and migrate towards the cell membrane. The host cell membrane has patches of viral transmembrane proteins (HA, NA, and M2) and an underlying layer of the M1 protein which assist the assembled virions to budding through the membrane, releasing finished enveloped viruses into the extracellular fluid.

The subtypes of influenza A virus are estimated to have diverged 2,000 years ago. Influenza viruses A and B are estimated to have diverged from a single ancestor around 4,000 years ago, while the ancestor of influenza viruses A and B and the ancestor of influenza virus C are estimated to have diverged from a common ancestor around 8,000 years ago.

Multiplicity reactivation
Influenza virus is able to undergo multiplicity reactivation after inactivation by UV radiation, or by ionizing radiation. If any of the eight RNA strands that make up the genome contains damage that prevents replication or expression of an essential gene, the virus is not viable when it alone infects a cell (a single infection).  However, when two or more damaged viruses infect the same cell (multiple infection), viable progeny viruses can be produced provided each of the eight genomic segments is present in at least one undamaged copy.  That is, multiplicity reactivation can occur.

Upon infection, influenza virus induces a host response involving increased production of reactive oxygen species, and this can damage the virus genome. If, under natural conditions, virus survival is ordinarily vulnerable to the challenge of oxidative damage, then multiplicity reactivation is likely selectively advantageous as a kind of genomic repair process.  It has been suggested that multiplicity reactivation involving segmented RNA genomes may be similar to the earliest evolved form of sexual interaction in the RNA world that likely preceded the DNA world.

Human influenza virus

"Human influenza virus" usually refers to those subtypes that spread widely among humans. H1N1, H1N2, and H3N2 are the only known influenza A virus subtypes currently circulating among humans.

Genetic factors in distinguishing between "human flu viruses" and "avian influenza viruses" include:
PB2: (RNA polymerase): Amino acid (or residue) position 627 in the PB2 protein encoded by the PB2 RNA gene. Until H5N1, all known avian influenza viruses had a Glu at position 627, while all human influenza viruses had a lysine.
HA: (hemagglutinin): Avian influenza HA binds alpha 2–3 sialic acid receptors, while human influenza HA binds alpha 2–6 sialic acid receptors. Swine influenza viruses have the ability to bind both types of sialic acid receptors.

Human flu symptoms usually include fever, cough, sore throat, muscle aches, conjunctivitis and, in severe cases, breathing problems and pneumonia that may be fatal. The severity of the infection will depend in large part on the state of the infected person's immune system and if the victim has been exposed to the strain before, and is therefore partially immune. Follow-up studies on the impact of statins on influenza virus replication show that pre-treatment of cells with atorvastatin suppresses virus growth in culture.

Highly pathogenic H5N1 avian influenza in a human is far worse, killing 50% of humans who catch it. In one case, a boy with H5N1 experienced diarrhea followed rapidly by a coma without developing respiratory or flu-like symptoms.

The influenza A virus subtypes that have been confirmed in humans, ordered by the number of known human pandemic deaths, are:
 H1N1 caused "Spanish flu" in 1918 and the 2009 swine flu pandemic
 H2N2 caused "Asian flu" in the late 1950s
 H3N2 caused "Hong Kong flu" in the late 1960s
 H5N1 is considered a global influenza pandemic threat through its spread in the mid-2000s
 H7N9 is responsible for a 2013 epidemic in China and considered by Dr. Michael Greger, author of How Not to Die, to have the greatest pandemic threat of the Influenza A viruses
 H7N7 has some zoonotic potential: it has rarely caused disease in humans
 H1N2 is currently endemic in pigs and has rarely caused disease in humans
 H9N2, H7N2, H7N3, H5N2, H10N7, H10N3, and H5N8

H1N1

H1N1 was responsible for the 2009  pandemic in both human and pig populations. A variant of H1N1 was responsible for the Spanish flu pandemic that killed some 50 million to 100 million people worldwide over about a year in 1918 and 1919. Another variant was named a pandemic threat in the 2009 flu pandemic. Controversy arose in October 2005, after the H1N1 genome was published in the journal, Science, because of fears that this information could be used for bioterrorism.

H1N2

H1N2 is endemic in pig populations  and has been documented in a few human cases. 

H2N2

The Asian flu, a pandemic outbreak of H2N2 avian influenza, originated in China in 1957, spread worldwide that same year during which an influenza vaccine was developed, lasted until 1958 and caused between one and four million deaths.

H3N2

H3N2 is currently endemic in both human and pig populations. It evolved from H2N2 by antigenic shift and caused the Hong Kong flu pandemic of 1968, and 1969, that killed up to 750,000. A severe form of the H3N2 virus killed several children in the United States in late 2003.

The dominant strain of annual flu in January 2006 was H3N2. Measured resistance to the standard antiviral drugs amantadine and rimantadine in H3N2 increased from 1% in 1994 to 12% in 2003 to 91% in 2005. Human H3N2 influenza viruses are now endemic in pigs in southern China, where they circulate together with avian H5N1 viruses.

H5N1

H5N1 is the world's major influenza pandemic threat.

H5N2

Japan's Health Ministry said January 2006 that poultry farm workers in Ibaraki prefecture may have been exposed to H5N2 in 2005. The H5N2 antibody titers of paired sera of 13 subjects increased fourfold or more.

H5N8

In February 2021, Russia reported the first known cases of H5N8 in humans. Seven people were confirmed to have been infected in December 2020 and have since recovered.  There was no indication of human-to-human transmission.

H5N9

A highly pathogenic strain of H5N9 caused a minor flu outbreak in 1966 in Ontario and Manitoba, Canada in turkeys.

H7N2

One person in New York in 2003, and one person in Virginia in 2002, were found to have serologic evidence of infection with H7N2. Both fully recovered.

H7N3

In North America, the presence of avian influenza strain H7N3 was confirmed at several poultry farms in British Columbia in February 2004.  As of April 2004, 18 farms had been quarantined to halt the spread of the virus.  Two cases of humans with avian influenza have been confirmed in that region. "Symptoms included conjunctivitis and mild influenza-like illness." Both fully recovered.

H7N7

H7N7 has unusual zoonotic potential. In 2003 in the Netherlands, 89 people were confirmed to have H7N7 influenza virus infection following an outbreak in poultry on several farms. One death was recorded.

H7N9

On 2 April 2013, the Centre for Health Protection (CHP) of the Department of Health of Hong Kong confirmed four more cases in Jiangsu province in addition to the three cases initially reported on 31 March 2013. This virus also has the greatest potential for an influenza pandemic among all of the Influenza A subtypes.

H9N2

Low pathogenic avian influenza A (H9N2) infection was confirmed in 1999, in China and Hong Kong in two children, and in 2003 in Hong Kong in one child. All three fully recovered.

H10N7

In 2004, in Egypt, H10N7 was reported for the first time in humans. It caused illness in two infants in Egypt. One child’s father was a poultry merchant.
H10N3

In May 2021, in Zhenjiang, China H10N3 was reported for the first time in humans. One person was infected.

Evolution

According to Jeffery Taubenberger:
"All influenza A pandemics since [the Spanish flu pandemic], and indeed almost all cases of influenza A worldwide (excepting human infections from avian viruses such as H5N1 and H7N7), have been caused by descendants of the 1918 virus, including "drifted" H1N1 viruses and reassorted H2N2 and H3N2 viruses. The latter are composed of key genes from the 1918 virus, updated by subsequently incorporated avian influenza genes that code for novel surface proteins, making the 1918 virus indeed the "mother" of all pandemics."

Researchers from the National Institutes of Health used data from the Influenza Genome Sequencing Project and concluded that during the ten-year period examined, most of the time the hemagglutinin gene in H3N2 showed no significant excess of mutations in the antigenic regions while an increasing variety of strains accumulated. This resulted in one of the variants eventually achieving higher fitness, becoming dominant, and in a brief interval of rapid evolution, rapidly sweeping through the population and eliminating most other variants.

In the short-term evolution of influenza A virus, a 2006 study found that stochastic, or random, processes are key factors. Influenza A virus HA antigenic evolution appears to be characterized more by punctuated, sporadic jumps as opposed to a constant rate of antigenic change. Using phylogenetic analysis of 413 complete genomes of human influenza A viruses that were collected throughout the state of New York, the authors of Nelson et al. 2006 were able to show that genetic diversity, and not antigenic drift, shaped the short-term evolution of influenza A via random migration and reassortment.  The evolution of these viruses is dominated more by the random importation of genetically different viral strains from other geographic locations and less by natural selection.  Within a given season, adaptive evolution is infrequent and had an overall weak effect as evidenced from the data gathered from the 413 genomes.  Phylogenetic analysis revealed the different strains were derived from newly imported genetic material as opposed to isolates that had been circulating in New York in previous seasons.  Therefore, the gene flow in and out of this population, and not natural selection, was more important in the short term.

Other animals
See H5N1 for the current epizootic (an epidemic in nonhumans) and panzootic (a disease affecting animals of many species especially over a wide area) of H5N1 influenza

Avian influenza

Fowl act as natural asymptomatic carriers of influenza A viruses. Prior to the current H5N1 epizootic, strains of influenza A virus had been demonstrated to be transmitted from wildfowl to only birds, pigs, horses, seals, whales and humans; and only between humans and pigs and between humans and domestic fowl; and not other pathways such as domestic fowl to horse.

Wild aquatic birds are the natural hosts for a large variety of influenza A viruses. Occasionally, viruses are transmitted from these birds to other species and may then cause devastating outbreaks in domestic poultry or give rise to human influenza pandemics.

H5N1 has been shown to be transmitted to tigers, leopards, and domestic cats that were fed uncooked domestic fowl (chickens) with the virus. H3N8 viruses from horses have crossed over and caused outbreaks in dogs. Laboratory mice have been infected successfully with a variety of avian flu genotypes.

Influenza A viruses spread in the air and in manure, and survives longer in cold weather. They can also be transmitted by contaminated feed, water, equipment, and clothing; however, there is no evidence the virus can survive in well-cooked meat. Symptoms in animals vary, but virulent strains can cause death within a few days. Avian influenza viruses that the World Organisation for Animal Health and others test for to control poultry disease include H5N1, H7N2, H1N7, H7N3, H13N6, H5N9, H11N6, H3N8, H9N2, H5N2, H4N8, H10N7, H2N2, H8N4, H14N5, H6N5, and H12N5.

Known outbreaks of highly pathogenic flu in poultry 1959–2003

 *Outbreaks with significant spread to numerous farms, resulting in great economic losses. Most other outbreaks involved little or no spread from the initially infected farms. 

More than 400 harbor seal deaths were recorded in New England between December 1979 and October 1980, from acute pneumonia caused by the influenza virus, A/Seal/Mass/1/180 (H7N7).

Swine flu

Swine influenza (or "pig influenza") refers to a subset of Orthomyxoviridae that create influenza and are endemic in pigs. The species of Orthomyxoviridae that can cause flu in pigs are influenza A virus and influenza C virus, but not all genotypes of these two species infect pigs. The known subtypes of influenza A virus that create influenza and are endemic in pigs are H1N1, H1N2, H3N1 and H3N2. In 1997, H3N2 viruses from humans entered the pig population, causing widespread disease among pigs.

Horse flu

Horse flu (or "equine influenza") refers to varieties of influenza A virus that affect horses. Horse flu viruses were only isolated in 1956. The two main types of virus are called equine-1 (H7N7), which commonly affects horse heart muscle, and equine-2 (H3N8), which is usually more severe. H3N8 viruses from horses have infected dogs.

Dog flu

Dog flu (or "canine influenza") refers to varieties of influenza A virus that affect dogs. The equine influenza virus H3N8 was found to infect and kill – with respiratory illness – greyhound race dogs at a Florida racetrack in January 2004.

Bat flu

Bat flu (or "Bat influenza") refers to the H17N10 and H18N11 influenza A virus strains that were discovered in Central and South American fruit bats as well as a H9N2 virus isolated from the Egyptian fruit bat. Until now it is unclear whether these bat-derived viruses are circulating in any non-bat species and whether they pose a zoonotic threat. Initial characterization of the H18N11 subtype, however, suggests that this bat influenza virus is not well adapted to any other species than bats.

H3N8

H3N8 is now endemic in birds, horses and dogs.

Subtype list 

Influenza A virus has the following subtypes:

 Influenza A virus subtype H1N1
 Influenza A virus subtype H1N2
 Influenza A virus subtype H2N2
 Influenza A virus subtype H2N3
 Influenza A virus subtype H3N1
 Influenza A virus subtype H3N2
 Influenza A virus subtype H3N8
 Influenza A virus subtype H5N1
 Influenza A virus subtype H5N2
 Influenza A virus subtype H5N3
 Influenza A virus subtype H5N6
 Influenza A virus subtype H5N8
 Influenza A virus subtype H5N9
 Influenza A virus subtype H6N1
 Influenza A virus subtype H6N2
 Influenza A virus subtype H7N1
 Influenza A virus subtype H7N2
 Influenza A virus subtype H7N3
 Influenza A virus subtype H7N4
 Influenza A virus subtype H7N7
 Influenza A virus subtype H7N9
 Influenza A virus subtype H9N2
 Influenza A virus subtype H10N3
 Influenza A virus subtype H10N7
 Influenza A virus subtype H10N8
 Influenza A virus subtype H11N2
 Influenza A virus subtype H11N9
 Influenza A virus subtype H17N10
 Influenza A virus subtype H18N11

See also 
 FI6 (antibody)
 Influenza vaccine
 Veterinary virology

Notes

Further reading 
Official sources

 Avian influenza and Influenza Pandemics from the Centers for Disease Control and Prevention
 Avian influenza FAQ from the World Health Organization
 Avian influenza information from the Food and Agriculture Organization
 U.S. Government's avian influenza information website
 European Centre for Disease Prevention and Control (ECDC) Stockholm, Sweden

General information

 "The Bird Flu and You" Full-color poster provided by the Center for Technology and National Security Policy at the National Defense University, in collaboration with the National Security Health Policy Center
 Special issue on avian flu from Nature
 Nature Reports: Homepage: Avian Flu
 
 Pandemic Influenza: Domestic Preparedness Efforts Congressional Research Service Report on Pandemic Preparedness.
 A guide to bird flu and its symptoms from BBC Health
 
 
 Links to Bird Flu pictures (Hardin MD/Univ of Iowa)

External links 
 Influenza Research Database – Database of influenza genomic sequences and related information.
 Health-EU portal European Union response to influenza

 
Animal virology
Zoonoses

de:Influenzavirus#Influenza-A-Subtypen